USS Brown (DD-546) was a  of the United States Navy, named for George Brown, a seaman on the crew of  during the raid that destroyed the captured  in Tripoli harbor during the First Barbary War. Entering service in 1943 during World War II, the ship saw active service until 1962 when she was decommissioned and sold to Greece. Renamed Navarinon, the destroyer was active until 1981 when she was sold for scrap.

Construction and career
Brown was launched on 21 February 1943 by Bethlehem Steel Co. San Pedro, California, sponsored by Mrs. Claude O. Kell, wife of Captain Kell. The ship was commissioned on 10 July 1943.

On 10 November 1943 Brown departed Pearl Harbor in company with Task Force 50 (TF 50) en route to the forward area. During Browns very active service in the Pacific, she screened carriers during 
 the Gilbert Islands invasion (21 November – 6 December 1943);
 Kavieng, New Ireland raids (25 December 1943 – 4 January 1944),
 Marshall Islands raids (29 January – 7 February),
 Truk raid (16–17 February);
 Palau-Yap-Woleai raids (30 March – 2 April);
 assault and capture of Hollandia, New Guinea (21–28 April);
 Truk raid (29 April);
 bombardment of Satawan (30 April);
 Ponape raids (1 May);
 Marcus Island raid (19–20 May);
 Wake Island raid (23 May);
 strikes in support of the assault on Saipan (1–26 June);
 Battle of the Philippine Sea, during which she rescued four American pilots (19–20 June),
 bombardment of Iwo Jima (4 July),
 assaults on Guam and on Tinian (12 July – 6 August);
 Yap raids (26–28 July);
 Chichi Jima raids (4–5 August);
 raids on Palau, Mindanao, Talaud, and Morotai,
 supporting the capture of the Southern Palaus and Ulithi (6–15 September);
 raids against Luzon and the Visayas (21–24 September);
 raids on Okinawa, Formosa, and Luzon (10–19 October);
 Battle for Leyte Gulf (26 October);
 raids on Manila and the Visayas (6 November),
 and raids against northern and central Philippines in support of the seizing of Mindoro Island (15–16 December).

Task Force 88 was caught in a typhoon (17–18 December), and strikes against Luzon were canceled in order to search for survivors of three missing destroyers. On 21 December Brown recovered 18 survivors of the destroyer  and six survivors of the destroyer . Brown then proceeded to Ulithi and received orders to return to Seattle, Washington, for overhaul. Repairs completed on 1 March 1945, she was ready for sea. After a brief stop at Pearl Harbor, Brown headed westward to take part in the Okinawa operation (1 April–30 June 1945), during which she was awarded the Navy Unit Commendation for her service as a radar picket ship; 3d Fleet operations against Japan (30 June–15 July); and the minesweeping operations southwest of Okinawa.

With the cessation of hostilities Brown served with the occupation forces in Japan until 28 October 1945. She then departed for Naval Station San Diego, arriving 17 November 1945. She went out of commission in reserve 1 August 1946 at San Diego.

1950–1962 

Brown was recommissioned 27 October 1950. She conducted intensive shakedown operations off the west coast and then reported to Commander, Naval Forces, Far East, in March 1951. From March until September she operated with Task Forces 77 and 95 and participated in the siege of Wonsan Harbor on two occasions. Brown returned to California in October 1951. Her next Western Pacific tour was between July 1952 and January 1953, during which time she operated on the Formosan Patrol. She made four further Far Eastern tours and operated along the West Coast.

Brown was decommissioned 9 February 1962.

Greek service 

The ship was transferred to Greece on 27 September 1962. She served in the Greek Navy as Navarinon (D63).

In 1981, the ship was stricken and scrapped.

Awards 
Brown received the Navy Unit Commendation, for services rendered during the Okinawa operation, in addition to 13 battle stars for her World War II service. She was awarded two battle stars for her Korean War service.

References 

       navsource.org: USS Brown
Extensive history of USS ''Brown

Fletcher-class destroyers of the United States Navy
Ships built in Los Angeles
1943 ships
World War II destroyers of the United States
Cold War destroyers of the United States
Fletcher-class destroyers of the Hellenic Navy